Dr. Major (Retd.) Tanbiruzzaman High School is a Bangladeshi secondary school located in Debiganj,  Debiganj Upazila, Panchagarh District, Rangpur Division.

Administration
The school is managed and administered by the Directorate of Secondary and Higher Education, under the guidance of the Ministry of Education and the Government of Bangladesh.

See also

 Education in Bangladesh
 List of schools in Bangladesh

References 

Educational institutions with year of establishment missing
Dinajpur Education Board
Schools in Panchagarh District